Live in Midgård is the first official live album released by Swedish symphonic metal band Therion. This double-disc album was recorded in Colombia, Germany and Hungary during the Secret of the Runes world tour in late 2001. Cover by Axel Jusseit and Thomas Ewerhard.

Track listing

CD one
 "Ginnungagap (Prologue)"
 "Invocation of Naamah" (original studio version on Theli (1996))
 "Birth of Venus Illegitima"
 "Enter Vril-Ya"
 "Riders of Theli"
 "Symphony of the Dead"
 "A Black Rose (Covered With Tears, Blood and Ice)"
 "The Return"
 "Baal Reginon"
 "Flesh of the Gods"
 "Seawinds" (Accept cover)
 "Schwarzalbenheim"
 "In the Desert of Set" (original studio version on Theli (1996))

CD two
 "The Wings of the Hydra"
 "Asgård"
 "The Secret of the Runes (Epilogue)"
 "The Rise of Sodom and Gomorrah"
 "Summer Night City" (ABBA cover)
 "The Beauty in Black"
 "Seven Secrets of the Sphinx"
 "Wine of Aluqah"
 "Raven of Dispersion"
 "To Mega Therion" (original studio version on Theli (1996))
 "Cults of the Shadow" (original studio version on Theli (1996))

Credits
Christofer Johnsson – lead and rhythm guitar, lead vocals
Kristian Niemann – lead and rhythm guitar
Johan Niemann – bass guitar
Sami Karppinen – drums

Guest musicians
Sarah Jezebel Deva – soprano, lead vocals
Maria Ottoson – soprano
Johanna Mårlöv – alto
Anders Engberg – tenor, lead vocals
Petri Heino – baritone
Risto Hämäläinen – baritone

External links
 
 
 Information about album at the official website

2002 live albums
Therion (band) live albums
Nuclear Blast live albums